Parbelia is a census town in the Neturia CD block in the Raghunathpur subdivision of the Purulia district in the Indian state of West Bengal.

Geography

Location
As per the map of Neturia CD block on page 309 of District Census Handbook, Puruliya. Saltore, Hijuli and Parbelia form a cluster of census towns.

Area overview
Purulia district forms the lowest step of the Chota Nagpur Plateau. The general scenario is undulating land with scattered hills. Raghunathpur subdivision occupies the northern part of the district. 83.80% of the population of the subdivision lives in rural areas. However, there are pockets of urbanization and 16.20% of the population lives in urban areas. There are 14 census towns in the subdivision. It is presented in the map given alongside. There is a coal mining area around Parbelia and two thermal power plants are there – the 500 MW Santaldih Thermal Power Station and the 1200 MW Raghunathpur Thermal Power Station. The subdivision has a rich heritage of old temples, some of them belonging to the 11th century or earlier. The Banda Deul is a monument of national importance. The comparatively more recent in historical terms, Panchkot Raj has interesting and intriguing remains in the area.

Note: The map alongside presents some of the notable locations in the subdivision. All places marked in the map are linked in the larger full screen map.

Demographics
According to the 2011 Census of India Parbeliya had a total population of 5,279 of which 2,783 (53%) were males and 2,496 (47%) were females. There were 613 persons in the age range of 0–6 years. The total number of literate persons in Parbeliya was 3,462 (74.20% of the population over 6 years).

 India census, Parbelia had a population of 6036. Males constitute 53% of the population and females 47%. Par Beliya has an average literacy rate of 59%, lower than the national average of 59.5%: male literacy is 69%, and female literacy is 48%. In Par Beliya, 14% of the population is under 6 years of age.

Infrastructure
According to the District Census Handbook 2011, Puruliya, Parbeliya covered an area of 6.23 km2. There is a railway station at Barakar, 8 km away. Among the civic amenities, the protected water supply involved hand pumps. It had 403 domestic electric connections. Among the medical facilities it had 4 dispensaries/ health centres, 1 maternity and child welfare centre. Among the educational facilities it had were 2 primary schools, 1 secondary school, 1 senior secondary school.

Economy

Coal
This area of Purulia district is linked with Dishergarh in Asansol subdivision with a bridge across the Damodar River. 

Collieries in the Sodepur Area of Eastern Coalfields are: Sodepur, Mouthdih, Parbelia, Dubeswari, Chinakuri I, Chinakuri II, Chinakuri III, Ranipur and Poidih. Out of these collieries Parbelia, Dubeswari and Ranipur are located in Purulia district, south of the Damodar River. There is a railway link from Ramkanali station on the Asansol-Adra line for colliery sidings.

Transport
State Highway 5 (West Bengal) running from Rupnarayanpur (in Bardhaman district) to Junput (in Purba Medinipur district) passes through Par Beliya.

Education
Panchakot Mahavidyalaya was established in 2001 at Sarbari.

Parbelia Colliery Hindi Higher Secondary School is a Hindi-medium institution established in 1945. It has facilities for teaching from class V to class XII.

Parbelia Colliery High School is a Bengali-medium coeducational institution established in 1964. It has facilities for teaching from class V to class XII.

See also
 Dishergarh
 Mugma

References

Cities and towns in Purulia district